Psyclones is an experimental industrial band started in 1980.  Psyclones are a long-standing band with a diverse sound, ranging from punk/post-rock/synth-pop to electronic industrial/ambient music. They released their Greatest Hits (1981–1991) CD which spans over a decade of intensely rich, enthusiastic music and lyrics that exemplify an era in their creative past.  Sounds range from hardcore punk/grunge/rock to industrial-core noise rock. Most of the tracks are very dance worthy. The overall sound is heavy and harsh, "musical mayhem." Psyclones also put out many lps and singles on other their own label Ladd-Frith.  Joining other independent musicians in on various cassette / LPs /industrial music / noise compilations.

Their performance at Club Foot was noteworthy. A live show in a small San Francisco underground club, the Psyclones played synth, tapes, echo trumpet, guitar, etc.....The show was industrial improvisational, but so subtle and fluid that you never thought, you were merely manipulated into thinking.

Members
Psyclones: Brian Ladd and Julie Frith 
Original Line up: Brian Ladd vocals guitar songwriter, Julie Frith bass, drummer Po (Robert) Poston, rhythm guitarist Dale Cairnes. 
Later the Psyclones lost their drummer and Rhythm guitar player and worked with Schlafengarten (Michael Karo) and Gregg Albright.

Discography
1981: "Electric Tone/ "Like You" Clone Tone 1981 7" 45rpm Single
1982: Ladd-Frith Music, cassettes then later CDs
1985: "Psyclones" 12" 33rpm LP - Subterranean Records - San Francisco, CA
1986: "Impromptu" 12" 33rpm LP RRR Records- Boston, USA
1986: "Another Bridge" 12" 33rpm LP - Dead Man's Curve - UK
1988: "Psy231" 10" 33rpm EP - Big Noise In Archgate - UK
1988: "Panic in Detroit" 7" 45rpm Single - Gigantic - UK
1991: "Greatest Hits 81-91" CD - Ladd-Frith - Eureka, CA
2011: "Different Thinking People" 12" 33rpm LP - Permanent Records - Chicago, IL
2021: "Tape Music 1980-84" 12" 33rpm LP - Notte Brigante, France

References

Cassette culture 1970s–1990s

External links
Ladd-Frith Music
Times-Standard 4-9-2020

American industrial music groups